Ann Shoemaker (born Anne Dorothea Shoemaker; January 10, 1891 – September 18, 1978) was an American actress who appeared in 70 films and TV movies between 1928 and 1976. She portrayed Sara Roosevelt, mother of Franklin D. Roosevelt, in both the stage and film versions of Sunrise at Campobello.

She was married to actor Henry Stephenson; the couple had a daughter.

Shoemaker's Broadway credits include Half a Sixpence (1965), Sunrise at Campobello (1958), The Living Room (1954), Twilight Walk (1951), Dream Girl (1951), Woman Bites Dog (1946), The Rich Full Life (1945), Proof Thro' the Night (1942), Ah, Wilderness! (1941), Black Sheep (1932), The Silent Witness (1931), The Novice and the Duke (1929), Button, Button (1919), To-Night at 12 (1928), Speak Easy (1927), We All Do (1927), The Noose (1926), and The Great God Brown (1926).

Partial filmography

 Chance at Heaven (1933) - Mrs. Harris
 Cross Country Cruise (1934) - Mrs. O'Shaughnessy - Baby's Mother (uncredited)
 Dr. Monica (1934) - Mrs. Hazlitt
 Cheating Cheaters (1934) - Mrs. Grace Palmer
 The Woman in Red (1935) - Cora Furness (uncredited)
 A Dog of Flanders (1935) - Frau Ilse Cogez
 Stranded (1935) - Mrs. Tuthill
 Alice Adams (1935) - Mrs. Adams
 Sins of Man (1936) - Anna Engel
 Shall We Dance (1937) - Matron
 They Won't Forget (1937) - Mrs. Mountford
 Stella Dallas (1937) - Miss Margaret Phillibrown
 The Life of the Party (1937) - Countess Martos
 Romance of the Redwoods (1939) - Mother Manning
 Almost a Gentleman (1939) - Mrs. Thompson (uncredited)
 They All Come Out (1939) - Dr. Ellen Hollis
 Babes in Arms (1939) - Mrs. Barton
 The Farmer's Daughter (1940) - Mrs. Bingham
 Seventeen (1940) - Mary Baxter
 The Marines Fly High (1940) - Mrs. Hill
 Curtain Call (1940) - Mrs. Middleton
 An Angel from Texas (1940) - Addie Lou Coleman
 My Favorite Wife (1940) - Ma - Nick's Mother
 Girl from Avenue A (1940) - Mrs. Maddox
 Strike Up the Band (1940) - Mrs. Connors
 Ellery Queen, Master Detective (1940) - Lydia Braun
 Scattergood Pulls the Strings (1941) - Mrs. Downs
 You'll Never Get Rich (1941) - Mrs. Barton
 Above Suspicion (1943) - Aunt Ellen
 What a Woman (1943) - Senator's Wife (uncredited)
 Man from Frisco (1944) - Martha Kennedy
 Mr. Winkle Goes to War (1944) - Martha Pettigrew, Jack's Mother (uncredited)
 Thirty Seconds Over Tokyo (1944) - Mrs. Parker
 What a Blonde (1945) - Mrs. DaFoe
 Conflict (1945) - Nora Grant
 Magic Town (1947) - Ma Peterman
 Sitting Pretty (1948) - Mrs. Ashcroft (uncredited)
 The Return of the Whistler (1948) - Mrs. Barkley
 Wallflower (1948) - Mrs. Dixie James
 A Woman's Secret (1949) - Mrs. Matthews
 Shockproof (1949) - Dr. Daniels (uncredited)
 The Reckless Moment (1949) - Mrs. Catherine Feller (uncredited)
 House by the River (1950) - Mrs. Ambrose
 Sunrise at Campobello (1960) - Sara Delano Roosevelt
 The Fortune Cookie'' (1966) - Sister Veronica

References

External links

1891 births
1978 deaths
Burials at Kensico Cemetery
Actresses from New York City
People from Brooklyn
American film actresses
American television actresses
20th-century American actresses
American stage actresses